Sapad, officially the Municipality of Sapad (Maranao: Inged a Sapad;), is a 5th class municipality in the province of Lanao del Norte, Philippines. According to the 2020 census, it has a population of 22,974 people.

History
Sapad was created by virtue of Republic Act No. 5745 where it is separated from the Municipality of Kapatagan, Province of Lanao del Norte, and constituted into a district and independent municipality, to be known as the Municipality of Sapad, same province. The seat of government of the new municipality shall be in the present site of the barrio Sapad.
The boundary of said territory shall be as follows:   
From km. 112 along Kapatagan-Buriasan Road, 
 S 7 deg. — 10 min. E. to point "A" located at the west corner of the agricultural land of Mr. Antonio Angeles, where he is at present residing and cultivating situated at barrio Katipunan, Kapatagan, Lanao del Norte, then
 S 73 deg. — 30 min. E, Distance 980 meters to point "B" on the same boundary, the 
 S 26 deg. — 00 min. E, Distance 2,000 meters to Balilisa Peak, them 
 S 53 deg. — 10 min. E, Distance 10,000 meters to Karkum Peak then 
 S 20 deg. — 10 min E, Distance 2,100 meters to Inayawan Peak, then follow the course of Cabuyao river downstream, down to point "G" intersection of Cabuyao, Pansilan and Maranding rivers. 
 S 25 deg. — 15 min. E. (Approx. more or less) Intersection of Cabuyao, Maranding and Pansilan Rivers to point "H", (Intersection of Cabayugan and Pansilan rivers), then
 S 22 deg. — 05 min. E., (Approx, more or less) Intersection of Babayugan river "H" to point "I", then 
 S 64 deg. — 30 min. W, Point "I" Junction km. 112.00 (Approx.)

Geography

Barangays
Sapad is politically subdivided into 17 barangays.

Climate

Demographics

Economy

References

External links
 Sapad Profile at the DTI Cities and Municipalities Competitive Index
 [ Philippine Standard Geographic Code]
Philippine Census Information
Local Governance Performance Management System

Municipalities of Lanao del Norte